Ricky Herron (born June 16, 1986) is a Jamaican footballer who has played in the USL First Division, and Canadian Soccer League.

Playing career 
Herron played in the USL First Division in 2007 with California Victory, where he appeared in three matches. In 2011, he played in the Canadian Soccer League with the York Region Shooters. He recorded his first goal for the club on August 21, 2011 against TFC Academy. In 2016 he featured in the CSL Championship match against Toronto Croatia, and helped secured the championship after a 5-4 victory in a penalty shootout.

References 

1986 births
Living people
Jamaican footballers
California Victory players
York Region Shooters players
USL First Division players
Canadian Soccer League (1998–present) players
Association football defenders